Tony Curtis (born 1955) is an Irish poet.

Curtis was born in Dublin, and educated at the University of Essex and at Trinity College, Dublin.  In 1993 he won the Poetry Ireland/Friends Provident National Poetry Competition. In 2018 he won the 2018 O'Shaughnessy Poetry Award presented by the University of St. Thomas in St. Paul, Minnesota.  He also works in education under the Skagit River Poetry Project schools programme.

Curtis is a member of Aosdána

Works
The Shifting of Stones (1986)
Behind the Green Curtain (1988)
This Far North (1994)
Three Songs of Home (1998)
The Book of Winter Cures (2002)
What Darkness Covers (2003)
The Well in the Rain (2006)
Days Like These (with Paula Meehan and Theo Dorgan) (2008)
Folk (2011)
Sandworks (with the Irish photographer Liam Blake) (2011)
An Elephant Called Rex (illustrated by Pat Mooney) (2011)
Aran Currach (with the Irish photographer Liam Blake) (2013)
Pony (with the artist David Lilburn) (2013)
Approximately in the Key of C (2015)
This Flight Tonight (2019)

References

External links
 Tony Curtis: Irish Poetry Reading Archive, UCD

1955 births
Living people
20th-century Irish poets
20th-century Irish male writers
Aosdána members
21st-century Irish poets
Irish male poets
21st-century Irish male writers